Chahar Rah-e Zirrah (also Romanized as Chahār Rāh-e Zīrrāh; also known as Chahār Rāh) is a village in Mahur Rural District, Mahvarmilani District, Mamasani County, Fars Province, Iran. At the 2006 census, its population was 33, in 9 families.

References 

Populated places in Mamasani County